Type III or Type 3 may refer to:

Japanese weapons
 Type 3 Chi-Nu, a Japanese medium tank
 Type 3 mine,  a Japanese land mine
 8 cm/40 3rd Year Type naval gun, a Japanese weapon
 Type 3 12 cm AA Gun, a Japanese weapon
 Type 3 Chū-SAM, a Japanese medium-range surface-to-air missile
 Type 3 heavy machine gun, a Japanese heavy machine gun of World War I
 Type 3 aircraft machine gun, a Japanese aircraft machine gun of World War II

Biology and medicine
 Hyperlipoproteinemia type III, a risk factor for cardiovascular disease
 Nitric oxide synthase 3, an enzyme
 Type III intermediate filaments, structural proteins
 Type III secretion system used by pathogenic bacteria

Mathematics
 Type III von Neumann algebra
 Type III sums of squares, a measurement of the explanatory power of a variable after accounting for all other variables in the model in statistics
 Type III error, any of several proposed extensions to the concept of Type I and type II errors in statistics

Other
 Type-III Civilization on the Kardashev scale, a way to classify civilizations
 British Railways Type 3 Diesel locomotives
 The Volkswagen Type 3
Peugeot Type 3
 The IBM Type-III Library, a distribution mechanism for unsupported IBM mainframe software such as CP/CMS
 PostScript fonts Type 3, a format of Postscript fonts
 Motorola Type IIi Hybrid, a trunked radio system
 IEC 62196 Type 3 connector type (alias Plug Alliance)
 R-Type III: The Third Lightning, a video game
 IEC Type III, one of the four "type" classifications of audio cassette formulation